Zanella Hnos., or simply Zanella, is an Argentine motorcycle and mini truck manufacturer founded in 1948, originally using 100 and 125 cc engines designed by Fabio Taglioni and licensed from Ceccato motorcycles of Italy. Zanella builds small motorcycles, mopeds and ATVs. Zanella formerly manufactured go-karts.

Zanella also produces the ZMax series of three-wheel motorcycles (trikes) and mini trucks. and the Force series of four-wheel light trucks.

Business 
Zanella makes mopeds, scooters, motorcycles, quad ATVs, karts and 4-stroke engines, ranging from 50 to 500 cc. However, only the mopeds are manufactured in Argentina at plants in Caseros and San Luis. Almost all other products are imported from China; usually in the form of knock down kits.

Based on onsite manufacture and assembly of imported motorcycles, Zanella plants have an installed production capacity of 12,000 units per month. It is expected that this current business plan will lead to the production level up to 14,000 units per month, returning to the levels of previous employment of approximately 1,000 direct employees and 3,000 indirect employees.

On December 22, 2009 an official presentation was held at the Zanella plant in Caseros, Buenos Aires by the Chamber of Manufacturers, Dealers and Suppliers of Motor Vehicles (Cámara de Fabricantes, Concesionarios y Proveedores de Motovehículos - CAFACOM). At the ceremony, General Confederation Entrepreneur of Argentina (CGERA) chairman Marcelo Fernández stated:

"As a national company, Zanella is constantly developing projects in defense of the motorcycle industry and the interests of customers; and that is why we are promoting the creation of the House of Moto, to get more and better benefits for both manufacturers and traders.

Models

Utilities
Zmax series are three wheelers
 TRICARGO 100 4T
 Z MAX 200
 ZMAX 200 Z2
 Z-MAX 200 S TRUCK
 Z-MAX 200 S TRUCK BOX
 Z-MAX 200 TRUCK Z2

CUBS
ZB110 Series
 ZB 110 Z1
 ZB 110 Z1 FULL

FUN
 HOT 90 G2

Street
 SAPUCAI 125 C
 RX 125 potenciado
 SAPUCAI 150
 RX 150 G3
 RX 150 G3 GHOST
 RX 150 G3 GHOST FULL
 RX 150 Z6 GHOST
 RX 150 Z3 SPORT
 RX 150 R FULL
 RX 200
 RX 1 150
 RX 150 Z5
 RX 1 200
 RX 200 MONACO
 RX 200 NAKED
 RX 200 R
 RX 200 R FULL
 RZ 20
 RX 250 SPORT
 RX 350
 RZ 25 NAKED
 RZ 25 R
 RZ 35 R

ON/OFF
 ZR 150
 ZR 200
 ZR 250 LT
 ZR 250
 ZTT 250 MOTARD

Scooters
 STYLER 150 R16
 STYLER 50 EXCLUSIVE
 STYLER 125 EXCLUSIVE G2
 STYLER 150 EXCLUSIVE
 STYLER 150 CRUISER
 MOD 150
 MOD LAMBRETTA 150
 E-STYLER
 E-STYLER DELUXE
 STYLER 250 CRUISER
 STYLER 250 GRANDCRUISER

CUSTOM
 PATAGONIAN EAGLE BLACKSTREET 150
 PATAGONIAN EAGLE BLACKMETAL 150
 PATAGONIAN EAGLE 150
 PATAGONIAN EAGLE 250
 SPEEDLIGHT 150
 SPEEDLIGHT 200
 PATAGONIAN EAGLE 250 II SHADOW
 PATAGONIAN EAGLE 250 DARKROAD
 PATAGONIAN EAGLE 350 CHOPPER

QUADS
 ZANELLA KIDS 50 SPORT
 FX KART 50
 FX KART 125
 FX KART 150
 FX 90 CARGO
 FX 90 SERIES
 FX 90 KIDS SPORT
 FX 150 CARGO
 FX 125 MADMAX
 FX 150 MADMAX
 FX 150 MADMAX AUTO.
 FX 200 MADMAX
 FX 250 MADMAX
 FX 250 MADMAX KING
 FX 300 MAD MAX
 GFORCE 200 4X2
 GFORCE 250 4X2
 GFORCE 250 II 4X2
 GFORCE 500 4X4

Electrical generators
Zanella also produces the following electrical generators:
 G-1000
 G-2500
 G-4500
 G-6000
 G-8500

Notes

External links

 
 Zanella at Sheldon's European Motorcycle Universe

Argentine brands
Manufacturing companies based in Buenos Aires
Motorcycle manufacturers of Argentina
Moped manufacturers
ATVs